Bois-des-Filion is an off-island suburb of Montreal, located in Quebec, Canada, to the north of Montreal.

Historically, hundreds of families annually travelled to this region seasonally to experience the magnificent maple forests; however the tourist industry is currently a minor source of income for the city.

The primary language spoken by its citizens is French, and the primary source of employment is general manufacturing.

Origin of the name 

The name Filion is derived from the surname of Antoine Feuillon, a local carpenter who could neither read nor write, and thus was unable to correct any errors in the spelling of his name as the first records were kept. Antoine Feuillion was the son of Michel Feuillon, a captain of the Musketeers of the Guards during the reign of the "Sun King", Louis XIV of France before his immigration to New France.

This town is named Bois des Filion because of the beautiful maple woods bordering it; le bois being French for "the woods". When the city was newly founded, one had to follow a path through these woods and ford a small river to enter the city.

History

This small town has a rich cultural history rooted in the legend of the lords, Céloron de Blainville and Lepage of Holy-Claire. Below are some important dates.

1684 - The first Filion migrates to Canada
1913 - The arrival of the Parish from the Abbot De Bray
1945 - An association of citizens is formed and the process of becoming an official city is begun
1949 - Bois-des-Filion becomes officially recognized as a city of Quebec and the first mayor is named, Joseph Germain.
1955 - The second largest cross in the province is erected on Notre-Dame hill to celebrate the 10 year anniversary since the first association of citizens was formed.
1980 - It became a municipality called Ville de Bois-des-Filion (City of Bois-des-Filion)

Demographics 

Government

Education
The Commission scolaire de la Seigneurie-des-Mille-Îles (CSSMI) operates Francophone public schools. The territory has the following schools:
 École secondaire Rive-Nord
 École Le Rucher pavillon Félix-Leclerc
Most students are zoned to Le Rucher, secondaire Hubert-Maisonneuve in Rosemère (for lower secondary), and Rive-Nord (for upper secondary). Some are zoned to École Marie-Soleil-Tougas in Terrebonne, École Le
Carrefour in Lorraine, and École secondaire du Harfang in Sainte-Anne-des-Plaines.

Sir Wilfrid Laurier School Board operates Anglophone public schools:
 McCaig Elementary School in Rosemère
 Rosemere High School in Rosemere

Notable residents

 Terry Farnsworth (born 1942), Olympic judoka
 Isabelle Hayeur (born 1969), visual artist 
 Serge Ménard  (born 1941), politician

References

External links
Ville de Bois-des-Filion (French)

Cities and towns in Quebec
Incorporated places in Laurentides
Greater Montreal